The Little Damozel is a 1916 British silent drama film directed by Wilfred Noy. A sound version, also based on the play by Monckton Hoffe, appeared in 1933.

Plot
In Monte Carlo, a gambler marries a singer for a bet, and eventually falls in love with her.

Cast
 J. Hastings Batson as Admiral Craven  
 Roy Byford as Beppo  
 Norah Chaplin as Cybil Craven  
 Barbara Conrad as Julie Alardy  
 Richard Lindsay as Captain Parkinson  
 Geoffrey Wilmer as Recklaw Poole

References

Bibliography
 Low, Rachael. History of the British Film, 1914-1918. Routledge, 2005.

External links

1916 films
1916 drama films
British drama films
Films directed by Wilfred Noy
British silent feature films
British black-and-white films
1910s English-language films
1910s British films
Silent drama films